Abdul Yunus bin Jamhari is a Malaysian politician who served as Member of the Perak State Executive Council (EXCO) in the Pakatan Harapan (PH) and Perikatan Nasional (PN) state administrations under former Menteri Besar Ahmad Faizal Azumu from May 2018 to the collapse of the PH state administration in March 2020 and again from March 2020 to the collapse of the PN state administration in December 2020. He is a member of the Malaysian United Indigenous Party (BERSATU), a component party of the federal ruling PN coalition and was a member of the People's Justice Party (PKR), a component party of the PH federal opposition coalition.

Election results

Honours
  :
  Knight Commander of the Order of the Perak State Crown (DPMP) – Dato' (2019)

References

Living people
People from Perak
Malaysian people of Malay descent
Malaysian Muslims
Former People's Justice Party (Malaysia) politicians
Malaysian United Indigenous Party politicians
Members of the Perak State Legislative Assembly
Perak state executive councillors
21st-century Malaysian politicians
Year of birth missing (living people)